This is a list of dams on the Colorado River system of the southwestern United States and northwestern Mexico. The Colorado runs  from the Rocky Mountains to the Gulf of California, draining parts of seven U.S. states and two Mexican states. The river system is one of the most heavily developed in the world, with fifteen dams on the main stem of the Colorado  and hundreds more on tributaries. Collectively, dams in the Colorado River basin can hold four to five times the river's annual flow, generating hydroelectricity and supplying irrigation and municipal water for over 35 million people.

Tributary dams are organized into two lists; those in the Upper Basin, defined as the half of the Colorado River basin above Lee's Ferry, Arizona, and the Lower Basin. The Upper Basin include such tributary systems as the Green, Gunnison and San Juan. Tributaries in the Lower Basin include the Little Colorado, Virgin and Gila. A key tributary of the San Juan River, the Animas River, was severely affected by the EPA's accidental August 2015 Gold King Mine waste water spill.

Notes:
Flood control: Temporary retention and quick release of flood flows
Hydropower: Generation of electricity utilizing water flow through the hydraulic head provided by the dam and reservoir
Irrigation: Provision and storage of water for agriculture
Municipal: Provision and storage of water for residential, commercial and industrial uses
Regulation: To control erratic inflows to provide either a stable flow downstream or to release water on demand to downstream users

Main stem

Upper Basin

Lower Basin

Notes

References

 
Colorado
Colorado dams